The women's 100 metres hurdles event at the 1970 British Commonwealth Games was held on 22 and 23 July at the Meadowbank Stadium in Edinburgh, Scotland. It was the first time that this distance was contested at the Games replacing the 80 metres hurdles.

Medalists

Results

Heats
Qualification: First 4 in each heat (Q) qualify directly for the final.

Wind:Heat 1: -1.2 m/s, Heat 2: 0.0 m/s

Final
Wind: -0.3 m/s

References

Heats results
Australian results

Athletics at the 1970 British Commonwealth Games
1970